"Prophecy" is a song recorded by Soulfly in 2003 and released on February 14, 2004. The song is found on the band's fourth album Prophecy as the first and title track. It is the only single released from the album.

Song

Composition 
"Prophecy" has a simple makeup with half-tribal rhythm and tuned down guitars overlaid with roaring vocals from Max Cavalera. The song opens with up and down riffs with lines of catchy vocals typical of Soulfly songs. Megadeth bassist David Ellefson plays the bass throughout the song. The song ends with fast, thrashy riff with Cavalera chanting "New millennium tribal War" four times.

Lyrics 
According to the lyrics, the song deals with prophecies surrounding tribes devastating cities in the desert next to the Red Sea, then marching to Mountains of Zion. While marching the way, he sees a blind sheep, crown of thorns, and flag of the conquering lion. After reaching the destination, prophecy continues with tribal war in the new millennium.

Music video 
The music video was filmed and takes place on the Navajo Nation in Monument Valley, Utah, meaning that Soulfly members perform in the desert on top of the pillar rock formation.

Personnel 
Regular members
 Max Cavalera – vocals, rhythm guitar
 Marc Rizzo – lead guitar
 Joe Nuñez – drums, percussion
Guest
 David Ellefson – bass
Other staff
 Max Cavalera – production, writing
 Terry Date – mixing

References 

Soulfly songs
2004 singles
Roadrunner Records singles
2004 songs
Songs written by Max Cavalera